Alice Practice is the debut EP from Crystal Castles, released on Merok Records on 9 July 2006. The release was limited to 500 copies on 7" vinyl and sold out in three days.

The title track, "Alice Practice", was claimed to be a soundcheck secretly recorded by the sound engineer before the band launched into a five-song recording session in 2005. This story has since been denied by Alice Glass, who claimed that this was untrue and that Ethan Kath fictionalised the story to minimise her input into the band. Crystal Castles later performed "Alice Practice" on an episode of the British television series Skins. After being featured on the show, demand for the Alice Practice EP grew rapidly. In October 2011, NME rated the song number 29 on its list of "150 Best Tracks of the Past 15 Years".

The track "Air War" garnered attention from prominent indie website Pitchfork Media. The track "Dolls" is exclusive to the Alice Practice EP and is not available on any other official release.

Track listing
"Alice Practice" – 2:16
"Dolls" – 1:33
"Air War" – 2:28
"Love and Caring" – 2:20

References

External links
 Lyrics at official website.

2006 debut EPs
Crystal Castles (band) albums